is a Japanese voice actress and singer. At the 2nd Seiyu Awards, she won Best New Actress with her roles in Powerpuff Girls Z as Momoko Akatsutsumi/Hyper Blossom and Lucky Star as Kagami Hiiragi. She also shared a Best Singing Award with the rest of the Lucky Star girls for the theme song "Motteke! Sailor Fuku".  At the 6th Seiyu Awards, she won Best Supporting Actress with roles such as Kyubey in Puella Magi Madoka Magica, Kenta Yumiya from Beyblade: Metal Fusion, Kiko Kayanuma in Darker than Black, and Mey-Rin  in Black Butler. She and fellow voice actress Kaori Fukuhara were in a duo music group called Kato*Fuku, which sang theme songs for When Supernatural Battles Became Commonplace and Battle Spirits Saikyo Ginga Ultimate Zero. Kato*Fuku released three albums from 2012 to 2015, and disbanded in 2016.  She left 81 Produce in February 2022.

Filmography

Anime

Film

Video games

Tokusatsu

Dubbing
 My Little Pony: Friendship is Magic (2013), Fluttershy
 Barbie and the Magic of Pegasus (2005), Rose
 Pinky Dinky Doo (2006), Pinky
 My Little Pony: Equestria Girls (2015), Fluttershy
 My Little Pony: Equestria Girls – Rainbow Rocks (2015), Fluttershy
 My Little Pony: Equestria Girls – Friendship Games (2016), Fluttershy
 My Little Pony: Equestria Girls – Legend of Everfree (2017), Fluttershy
 My Little Pony: Equestria Girls (2017 television specials) (2017), Fluttershy
 My Little Pony: Equestria Girls (Digital Series) (2017), Fluttershy
 My Little Pony: The Movie (2018), Fluttershy
 Lego Monkie Kid (2021), MK
 Mechamato (2022), Mara

Live action

Discography

Albums

Singles

Character albums

Drama CD and audio recordings

with Kato*Fuku

Kato*Fuku albums

Kato*Fuku singles

References

External links
  
 
 Emiri Katō at Oricon 

1983 births
Living people
Voice actresses from Tokyo Metropolis
People from Fussa, Tokyo
Japanese video game actresses
Japanese voice actresses
Seiyu Award winners
21st-century Japanese women singers
21st-century Japanese singers